Supervivientes: Perdidos en el Honduras, was the second season of Supervivientes and the eight season of Survivor (TV series) to air in Spain. This season was filmed in Cayo Paloma, Honduras. Jesus Vazquez was the host of the main show this season with Mario Picazo doing daily summaries from the island with the contestants from Monday to Friday at 17.45, and Lucia Riaño presented the debate Sunday at midnight. The show was broadcast from April 19, 2007 to June 28, 2007. The main twist this season was that of the "Judas Kiss", which gave an eliminated contestant the right to vote at the tribal council immediately following their elimination. Ultimately, it was Nilo Manrique who won this season over Juan Oiarzabal and Rebecca Loos.

Finishing order

Nominations table 

: As the winner of the immunity challenge, Juan was given the power to name a second nominee.
: As the winner of the immunity challenge, Elizabeth was given the power to name a second nominee.
: As the winner of the immunity challenge, Rebecca was given the power to name a second nominee.
: As the winner of the immunity challenge, Carlo was given the power to name a second nominee and was forced to break the tie that occurred at the tenth tribal councils.
: As the winner of the immunity challenge, Nilo was given the power to name a second nominee.
: As the winner of the immunity challenge, Javián was given the power to name a second nominee.
: As the winner of the immunity challenge, Rebecca was given the power to name a second nominee.
: As the winner of the immunity challenge, Nilo was given the power to name a second nominee.
: As they lost the final immunity challenge, Javián, Juan, and Rebecca were automatically nominated for elimination.

External links
http://worldofbigbrother.com/Survivor/Spa/8/news.shtml

Survivor Spain seasons